Berea (also Seven-Day Mill or Seventh Day Settlement) is an unincorporated community in southeastern Ritchie County, West Virginia, United States.  It lies along West Virginia Route 74 southeast of the town of Harrisville, the county seat of Ritchie County.  Its elevation is 751 feet (229 m).  Although it is unincorporated nor has a  post office, the ZIP code is 26327.  Postal customers are serviced by the Harrisville and Auburn post offices.

The community was named after the city of Berea, mentioned in the Bible.

References

Unincorporated communities in Ritchie County, West Virginia
Unincorporated communities in West Virginia